Schoelen is a surname. Notable people with the surname include: 

Jill Schoelen (born 1963), American actress
Mary J. Schoelen (born 1968), American judge

See also
Scholen